Italy national hockey team may refer to:

 Italy men's national ball hockey team
 Italy women's national ball hockey team
 Italy men's national field hockey team
 Italy women's national field hockey team
 Italy men's national ice hockey team
 Italy women's national ice hockey team
 Italy men's national inline hockey team
 Italy women's national inline hockey team
 Italy men's national roller hockey team
 Italy women's national roller hockey team